"Envole-moi" is a French language song written, composed and recorded by Jean-Jacques Goldman taken from his 1984 album Positif. The single sold over half a million copies and was certified gold. Goldman explained that the song is a "cry for help" by a young man.

Track list
1984
Side A: "Envole-moi" (5:07)
Side B: "Dors bébé, dors" (3:26)

Interpretations
"Envole-moi" became a main song in the Jean-Jacques Goldman repertoire during his 1986 tour and a live version of his appeared in the album released from the tour in the 1986 album entitled En public with the latter part of the original lyrics omitted.

In yet another live album released in 1989 entitled Traces, part of the song was interpreted by Goldman as part of a medley and introduced after a "guitar duel" between Goldman and Michael Jones, one of his partners in the musical collaboration Fredericks Goldman Jones. The medley included in order of occurrence: "Je marche seul" / "Quand la musique est bonne" / "Au bout de mes rêves" / "Il suffira d'un signe" / "Envole-moi" / "Encore un matin".

In 1994, he came back to the song in the Fredericks Goldman Jones album Du New Morning au Zénith. This interpretation was a duo with Carole Fredericks. Other notable changes included addition of a guitar solo. The song starts with the ominous coming of a storm.

In 2003, Jean-Jacques Goldman recorded yet another version with Michael Jones on the Fredericks Goldman Jones live album of a concert at Zénith de Lille and entitled Un tour ensemble.

Charts

Weekly charts

Year-end charts

Certifications

Covers
The song has been subject of many covers.

Grégory Lemarchal version
A 2007 cover was done by Grégory Lemarchal produced by Rémi Lacroix. It is found in his album La voix d'un ange. The album reached #1 on SNEP, French Albums Chart.

Almazian Symphony version
In 2012, the Almazian Symphony made an symphonic orchestra arrangement cover of "Envole-moi" with backing vocals choir and but without the main lyrics.

Génération Goldman (M. Pokora and Tal) version

In 2012, "Envole-moi" became the main release from the Génération Goldman project in which well-known French artists interpret Jean-Jacques Goldman songs. It was pre-released by the project in October 2012 in preparation of a major launch of the compilation album on 19 November 2012. The album will include interpretations, amongst others, Pokora, Tal, ZAZ, Shym, Irma, Corneille, Amel Bent, Christophe Willem and others.

M. Pokora and Tal performed it live as a guest appearance in Danse avec les stars French series in season 3.

Charts

M. Pokora & Tal

References

French-language songs
1984 singles
2012 singles
Jean-Jacques Goldman songs
M. Pokora songs
Tal (singer) songs
Songs written by Jean-Jacques Goldman
1984 songs
Epic Records singles
Warner Music Group singles